Scoliaxon is a monotypic genus of flowering plants belonging to the family Brassicaceae. The only species is Scoliaxon mexicanus.

Its native range is Northeastern Mexico.

References

Brassicaceae
Monotypic Brassicaceae genera